7th Sky Entertainment (or Seventh Sky Entertainment) is a Pakistani television production house. It has produced and aired many television series of various genres on different channels. The house was founded by Abdullah Kadwani & Asad Qureshi. The production company produces most content for and of Geo Entertainment.

Management positions
 Abdullah Kadwani (Group Managing Director of Geo Entertainment and co-founder of 7th Sky Entertainment)
 Asad Qureshi (Chief Operating Officer of Geo Entertainment and co-founder of 7th Sky Entertainment)
 Humayun Saeed (co-founder of 7th Sky Entertainment)

Programs produced

Current programme

Former programme

Television film
Flirting Kay Side Effects- ARY Digital (2009)
Nesvita-Women of Strength- 2010
Telenor-Karo Mumkin-2010
Ronaq Jahan Ka Nafsiyati Gharana- ARY Digital (2010)
Pyaar Mein Twist
Shakoor Sahab- ARY Digital (2011)
 TUC- The Lighter Side of Life
Saray Ghaat Ki Farzana
Love Mein Twist
Aur Ghanti Baj Gayi
Hum Chale Aaye
Dino Ki Dulhaniya
Teri Meri Kahani
Romantic Razia
Ruposh

Films produced 
 Armaan (2013 film)
 Chambaili (2013 film)

References

External links 
  of 7th Sky Entertainment

 
Television production companies of Pakistan
Mass media companies of Pakistan
Film production companies of Pakistan